The Uyghur Forced Labor Prevention Act is a United States federal law that would change U.S. policy on China's Xinjiang Uyghur Autonomous Region (XUAR, or Xinjiang) with the goal of ensuring that American entities are not funding forced labor among ethnic minorities in the region.

The bill was first introduced in the 116th Congress and on September 22, 2020, the bill passed the House by 406–3 vote. The three no votes were cast by Justin Amash, Warren Davidson, and Thomas Massie. The bill died in committee in the Senate.

The bill was reintroduced in the 117th Congress and unanimously passed the Senate on July 14, 2021. On December 8, 2021, a similar bill passed the House by a 428–1 vote. Thomas Massie was the sole no vote. A revised version that eliminated differences between the House and Senate bills passed the House on December 14, 2021, and the Senate on December 16, 2021. It was signed into law by President Joe Biden on December 23, 2021.

Background

Xinjiang and allegations of forced labor 

Between 2014 and 2018, the cotton industry in Xinjiang saw a massive increase in output and employment.

According to an August 2019 book by Han Lianchao, Vice President of Citizen Power Initiatives for China, forced labor is so commonplace in Xinjiang that it is difficult to separate the forced labor economy from the regular economy. Han estimates that there are 500,000 to 800,000 people held in the more than seventy prisons in Xinjiang and that these prisoners are used for forced labor in numerous industries. Han further suspects that the million Uyghurs in the Xinjiang internment camps are likely also used for forced labor in a similar manner. Han says that because Xinjiang supplies nearly 84 percent of China's cotton, any cotton, textile or garment products from China are likely tainted with forced labor. Han's study concludes that products of this forced labor system have entered into international commerce, including the US and Europe, and that governments, companies and consumers should assume that any cotton products sourced from China are the product of forced labor in Xinjiang (XUAR). The report recommended banning certain imports from Xinjiang to the United States.

In September 2019, Nury Turkel, a Uyghur American lawyer and human rights advocate, testified to Congress that Uyghurs were being swept into a vast system of forced labor. Turkel said persons in the Xinjiang re-education camps are often moved to factories and recommended bans on cotton and textile products from Xinjiang until internment policies are abolished and conditions for due diligence are established.

In November 2019, Nathan Ruser, researcher at the Australian Strategic Policy Institute saidYou can't be sure that you don't have coerced labour in your supply chain if you do cotton business in China ... Xinjiang labour and what is almost certainly coerced labour is very deeply entrenched into the supply chain that exists in Xinjiang.According to an August 2020 piece in The New York Times (NYT), it was estimated that roughly one in five cotton garments sold globally contains cotton or yarn from Xinjiang. It also reported that investigations by NYT, Wall Street Journal, and Axios found evidence connecting the detention of Uyghurs to supply chains of major fashion retailers.

Academics Zhun Xu and Fangfei Lin write that the conclusion of forced labor in the cotton production in Xinjiang is insufficiently supported. They cite the historic significance of Uyghur agricultural workers as a long-standing labor force for manual cotton harvesting and staffing companies' widespread recruitment of Uyghur workers due to lower travel costs. In their view, "[T]he labor demand of Uyghur seasonal cotton pickers in south Xinjiang is largely decided by its relatively low degree of agricultural capitalization, not due to the 'special treatment' towards labor migrants of a certain ethnic minority."

On September 17, 2020, China's State Council Information Office rejected claims of forced labor in Xinjiang, saying that ideologically biased international forces have applied double standards to Xinjiang and denied recognition of local efforts to protect human rights.

On October 21, 2020, the Subcommittee on International Human Rights (SDIR) of the Canadian House of Commons Standing Committee on Foreign Affairs and International Development called on the Canadian government to condemn Beijing's policies against the Uyghurs, which the subcommittee said included forced labour.

Existing legislation and bans
Since 1930, all goods made with forced labor have been banned in the United States under the Smoot–Hawley Tariff Act. Under current rules, goods are banned if there is reasonable evidence of forced labor in the creation of the goods.

On September 14, 2020, the U.S. Department of Homeland Security blocked imports of products from four entities in Xinjiang: all products made with labor from the Lop County No. 4 Vocational Skills Education and Training Center; hair products made in the Lop County Hair Product Industrial Park; apparel produced by Yili Zhuowan Garment Manufacturing Co., Ltd. and Baoding LYSZD Trade and Business Co., Ltd; and cotton produced and processed by Xinjiang Junggar Cotton and Linen Co., Ltd.

On December 2, 2020, citing forced labor concerns, the U.S. Customs and Border Protection's (CBP) Office of Trade issued a Withhold Release Order (WRO) directing personnel at all U.S. ports of entry to detain all shipments containing cotton and cotton products originating from the Xinjiang Production and Construction Corps (XPCC).

Legislative history

On September 22, 2020, the bill passed the House by a 406–3 vote, with Republicans Thomas Massie, Warren Davidson and Libertarian Justin Amash voting against.

An updated version was reintroduced in the 117th Congress. It passed the House in a 428–1 vote on December 8, 2021, with Thomas Massie as the lone vote against it, then passed the Senate unanimously (100-0), and was signed into law by President Biden on December 23, 2021.

Purpose of legislation
The Uyghur Forced Labor Prevention Act made it U.S. policy to assume (a "rebuttable presumption") that all goods manufactured in Xinjiang are made with forced labor, unless the commissioner of U.S. Customs and Border Protection certifies that certain goods are known to not have been made with forced labor. The bill also calls for the President of the United States to impose sanctions on "any foreign person who 'knowingly engages'" in forced labor using minority Muslims. The bill further requires firms to disclose their dealings with Xinjiang. A list of Chinese companies that have relied on forced labor is mandated to be compiled.

Reactions

Domestic
United States Commission on International Religious Freedom (USCIRF) commissioners Gary Bauer, James W. Carr, and Nury Turkel have called on Congress to pass the act. The AFL–CIO and Ethics & Religious Liberty Commission of the Southern Baptist Convention have supported the Uyghur Forced Labor Prevention Act. Sophie Richardson, the China director of Human Rights Watch, said in April 2020 that the bill was unprecedented and could put pressure on companies seen as having some sway with Chinese authorities.

The president of the American Apparel & Footwear Association said that blanket import bans on cotton or other products from Xinjiang from such legislation would "wreak havoc" on legitimate supply chains in the apparel industry because Xinjiang cotton exports are often intermingled with cotton from other countries and there is no available origin-tracing technology for cotton fibers. On September 22, 2020, the United States Chamber of Commerce issued a letter stating that the act "would prove ineffective and may hinder efforts to prevent human rights abuses." Major companies with supply chain ties to Xinjiang, including Apple Inc., Nike, Inc., and The Coca-Cola Company, have lobbied Congress to weaken the legislation and amend its provisions.

Foreign

The stance of the Chinese government and its ruling Chinese Communist Party on this as taken from People's Daily: "The U.S. act fabricates the so-called "forced labor" issue in China's Xinjiang and grossly interferes in China's internal affairs under the pretext of human rights, said a statement issued by the Foreign Affairs Committee of China's National People's Congress. "Should the United States choose to go down the wrong path, China will take resolute and forceful countermeasures," said the statement.

Noting that the policies and practices concerning employment and job security in Xinjiang comply with China's Constitution and relevant laws and conform to international labor and human rights standards, the statement said that there is no such thing as "forced labor" in Xinjiang.

See also

 Penal labor in the United States
 Uyghur detainees at Guantanamo Bay
 Uyghur Human Rights Policy Act
 Uyghur genocide
 Xinjiang internment camps
 Tibet Policy and Support Act
 Hong Kong Human Rights and Democracy Act
 Magnitsky Act
 Mihrigul Tursun
 Xinjiang conflict
 Zhu Hailun
 United States sanctions against China

References

United States foreign relations legislation
Acts of the 117th United States Congress
Uyghurs
Sanctions legislation
Human rights legislation
China–United States relations
United States sanctions
Sanctions against China